Stempfferia liberti is a butterfly in the family Lycaenidae. It is found in Cameroon. The habitat consists of riverine mosaic forest along the Nyong River.

References

Butterflies described in 1998
Poritiinae
Endemic fauna of Cameroon
Butterflies of Africa